Yngve Stiernspetz (27 April 1887 – 4 April 1945) was a Swedish gymnast who competed in the 1912 Summer Olympics. He was part of the Swedish team that won the all-around Swedish system event.

After graduating from a high school Stiernspetz enlisted to the Swedish artillery. He was promoted to captain in 1925, and two years later became head of the Småland Artillery Regiment. In 1931, he was awarded with the Order of the Sword.

References

1887 births
1945 deaths
Swedish male artistic gymnasts
Gymnasts at the 1912 Summer Olympics
Olympic gymnasts of Sweden
Olympic gold medalists for Sweden
Olympic medalists in gymnastics
Medalists at the 1912 Summer Olympics
People from Eksjö Municipality
Sportspeople from Jönköping County